Salloum may refer to:

 Sallum, a town in Egypt close to its border with Libya.

Surname
Abdullah Al-Salloum (born 1981), Kuwaiti economist
Fawzi Salloum (born 1943), Syrian wrestler
Habeeb Salloum (1924–2019), Arab Canadian author
Jackie Salloum, American screenwriter and artist
Jayce Salloum (born 1958), Canadian multidisciplinary artist
Maximos Salloum (1920–2004), Archbishop in Israel

First names
Salloum Mokarzel (1881–1952), Lebanese American publicist and intellectual
Salloum Kaysar, Lebanese cyclist